A Witchfinder is a person who seeks witches in a witch-hunt.

Witchfinder may also refer to:
 The Witchfinder (TV series), a 2022 British sitcom
 "The Witchfinder", an  episode in the second series of Merlin
 "The Witchfinder", a song by Amorphous Androgynous from Alice in Ultraland
 "The Witchfinders", an episode of Doctor Who

See also
 Witchfinder General (disambiguation)
 Witch hunter (disambiguation)